Ak-Tüz is a village in the Kemin District of Chüy Region of Kyrgyzstan. Its population was 827 in 2021. Until 2012 it was an urban-type settlement.

Population

References

Populated places in Chüy Region